The 2000 NASCAR Craftsman Truck Series was the sixth season of the Craftsman Truck Series, the third highest stock car racing series sanctioned by NASCAR in the United States. Greg Biffle of Roush Racing was crowned the series champion.

The season was marred by the death of Tony Roper in the penultimate race of the season at Texas Motor Speedway. His death was the third of three driver fatalities across the nationwide NASCAR circuits in 2000 that included Kenny Irwin Jr. and Adam Petty.

Teams & Drivers

Complete schedule

Partial schedule

Races

Daytona 250 

The inaugural Daytona 250 was held on February 18 at Daytona International Speedway. Joe Ruttman won the pole.

Top ten results

Failed to qualify: Brad Teague (#04), Lance Hooper (#9), Rick Ware (#51), Peter Gibbons (#01), Carl Long (#91), Ricky Sanders (#19), Brian Sockwell (#54), Matt Mullins (#09), Kenny Allen (#28), Wayne Edwards (#93), Jeff Spraker (#69), Gary Bradberry (#80), Tom Powers (#5), Tommy Croft (#71), Joe Buford (#11), Phil Bonifield (#23)

During this race, Geoff Bodine was involved in a serious accident that collected many trucks and damaged the fence, causing his truck to flip over several times and become engulfed in flames. He survived the accident.
Also, in this race, Kurt Busch makes his NASCAR Craftsman Truck Series debut, and ended up finishing second to Mike Wallace.

Florida Dodge Dealers 400K 

The Florida Dodge Dealers 400K was held February 26 at Homestead-Miami Speedway. Joe Ruttman won the pole.

Top ten results

60-Andy Houston
2-Mike Wallace
24-Jack Sprague
18-Joe Ruttman
50-Greg Biffle
25-Randy Tolsma
14-Rick Crawford
88-Terry Cook
99-Kurt Busch
75-Marty Houston

Failed to qualify: none

Chevy Trucks NASCAR 150 

The Chevy Trucks NASCAR 150 was held March 18 at Phoenix International Raceway. Joe Ruttman won the pole.

Top ten results

18-Joe Ruttman
24-Jack Sprague
60-Andy Houston
99-Kurt Busch
50-Greg Biffle
1-Dennis Setzer
43-Steve Grissom
41-Randy Renfrow
2-Mike Wallace
14-Rick Crawford

Failed to qualify: Milan Garrett (#85), Bobby Hillis (#05)

Dodge California 250 

The Dodge California 250 was held March 26 at Mesa Marin Raceway. Mike Wallace won the pole.

Top ten results

2-Mike Wallace
99-Kurt Busch
24-Jack Sprague
43-Steve Grissom
41-Randy Renfrow
3-Bryan Reffner
88-Terry Cook
1-Dennis Setzer
14-Rick Crawford
60-Andy Houston

Failed to qualify: Rick Ware (#51), Milan Garrett (#85)

NAPA 250 

The NAPA 250 was held April 10 at Martinsville Speedway. Mike Wallace won the pole.

Top ten results

4-Bobby Hamilton
2-Mike Wallace
24-Jack Sprague
1-Dennis Setzer
43-Steve Grissom
18-Joe Ruttman
25-Randy Tolsma
3-Bryan Reffner
84-Scott Riggs
16-Jimmy Hensley

Failed to qualify: Wayne Edwards (#91), Carl Long (#91), Andy Genzman (#27), Billy Venturini (#83), Rick Ware (#51), Tom Bambard (#30), Paul Carman (#08), Bobby Norfleet (#34)

LINE-X 225 

The LINE-X 225 was held April 22 at Portland International Raceway. Greg Biffle won the pole.

Top ten results

60-Andy Houston
1-Dennis Setzer
24-Jack Sprague
2-Mike Wallace
14-Rick Crawford
16-Jimmy Hensley
3-Bryan Reffner
43-Steve Grissom
75-Marty Houston
31-John Young

Failed to qualify: none

Thirty-three drivers qualified for this race, 1 short of the usual 34. 
Two African-American drivers ran in this race, the only time in a national series: Bobby Norfleet and Bill Lester. Lester ran the entire race and finished 24th. Norfleet, who qualified 11 miles per hour slower than the pole and was black flagged three times for failing to maintain a reasonable pace, was credited with a 32nd-place finish.

Ram Tough 200 

The Ram Tough 200 was held May 7 at Gateway International Raceway. Greg Biffle won the pole.

Top ten results

24-Jack Sprague
16-Jimmy Hensley
25-Randy Tolsma
50-Greg Biffle
18-Joe Ruttman
43-Steve Grissom
2-Mike Wallace
3-Bryan Reffner
88-Terry Cook
41-Randy Renfrow

Failed to qualify: Morgan Shepherd (#23), Wayne Edwards (#93), Rick Ware (#51) Stan Boyd (#89), Steve Stevenson (#11)

Quaker State 200 

The Quaker State 200 was held May 13 at Memphis Motorsports Park. Bobby Hamilton won the pole.

Top ten results

24-Jack Sprague
50-Greg Biffle
1-Dennis Setzer
43-Steve Grissom
14-Rick Crawford
25-Randy Tolsma
3-Bryan Reffner
98-Kenny Martin
16-Jimmy Hensley

Failed to qualify: Stan Boyd (#89), R. D. Smith (#79), Patrick Lawler (#38), Tom Powers (#5), Ricky Sanders (#19), Thomas Boston (#81), Phil Bonifield (#23), Paul Carman (#08)

Grainger.com 200 

The Grainger.com 200 was held May 21 at Pikes Peak International Raceway. Andy Houston won the pole.

Top ten results

50-Greg Biffle
99-Kurt Busch
60-Andy Houston
24-Jack Sprague
1-Dennis Setzer
17-Ricky Hendrick
41-Randy Renfrow
3-Bryan Reffner
86-Scott Riggs
75-Marty Houston

Failed to qualify: Bobby Norfleet (#34)

Sears 200 

The Sears 200 was held June 3 at Evergreen Speedway. Joe Ruttman won the pole.

Top ten results

24-Jack Sprague
25-Randy Tolsma
18-Joe Ruttman
50-Greg Biffle
99-Kurt Busch
1-Dennis Setzer
66-Rick Carelli
60-Andy Houston
86-Scott Riggs
3-Bryan Reffner

Failed to qualify: Jason Roche (#04), Bobby Hillis (#05), Bobby Norfleet (#34)

Pronto Auto Parts 400K 

The Pronto Auto Parts 400K was held June 9 at Texas Motor Speedway. Greg Biffle won the pole.

Top ten results

50-Greg Biffle
2-Mike Wallace
25-Randy Tolsma
60-Andy Houston
3-Bryan Reffner
99-Kurt Busch
75-Marty Houston
14-Rick Crawford
73-B. A. Wilson
86-Scott Riggs

Failed to qualify: none

Kroger 225 

The inaugural Kroger 225 was held June 17 at Kentucky Speedway. Bryan Reffner won the pole.

Top ten results

50-Greg Biffle
24-Jack Sprague
2-Mike Wallace
75-Marty Houston
3-Bryan Reffner
25-Randy Tolsma
66-Rick Carelli
46-Rob Morgan
60-Andy Houston
14-Rick Crawford

Failed to qualify: Michael Dokken (#17)

Bully Hill Vineyards 150 

The Bully Hill Vineyards 150 was held June 24 at Watkins Glen International. Greg Biffle won the pole. 

Top ten results

50-Greg Biffle
99-Kurt Busch
7-Ron Fellows
2-Mike Wallace
24-Jack Sprague
60-Andy Houston
1-Dennis Setzer
12-Carlos Contreras
14-Rick Crawford
25-Randy Tolsma

Failed to qualify: Donny Morelock (#4), Jason Thom (#37)

The race was the last Truck race on a road course until 2013, when the Chevrolet Silverado 250 was held at Canadian Tire Motorsport Park.

The Truck Series would not return to Watkins Glen for twenty one years.

Sears DieHard 200 

The Sears DieHard 200 was held July 1 at The Milwaukee Mile. Kurt Busch won the pole.

Top ten results

99-Kurt Busch
25-Randy Tolsma
50-Greg Biffle
43-Steve Grissom
2-Andy Houston
75-Marty Houston
90-Lance Norick
24-Jack Sprague
86-Scott Riggs
3-Bryan Reffner

Failed to qualify: none

thatlook.com 200 

The thatlook.com 200 was held July 8 at New Hampshire International Speedway. Joe Ruttman won the pole.

Top ten results

99-Kurt Busch
2-Mike Wallace
25-Randy Tolsma
50-Greg Biffle
60-Andy Houston
86-Scott Riggs
17-Ricky Hendrick
51-Michael Dokken
52-Ken Schrader
75-Marty Houston

Failed to qualify: none

Chevy Silverado 200 

The Chevy Silverado 200 was held July 15 at Nazareth Speedway. Joe Ruttman won the pole.

Top ten results

1-Dennis Setzer
18-Joe Ruttman
50-Greg Biffle
43-Steve Grissom
24-Jack Sprague
88-Terry Cook
16-Jimmy Hensley
66-Rick Carelli
3-Bryan Reffner
2-Mike Wallace

Failed to qualify: none

Michigan 200 

The Michigan 200 was held July 22 at Michigan International Speedway. Jamie McMurray won the pole.

Top ten results

50-Greg Biffle
99-Kurt Busch
2-Mike Wallace
60-Andy Houston
1-Dennis Setzer
41-Jamie McMurray
14-Rick Crawford
75-Marty Houston
29-Terry Cook
25-Randy Tolsma

Failed to qualify: Ricky Sanders (#19)

Power Stroke Diesel 200 

The Power Stroke Diesel 200 was held August 3 at Indianapolis Raceway Park. Joe Ruttman won the pole.

Top ten results

18-Joe Ruttman
52-Lyndon Amick
41-Jamie McMurray
2-Mike Wallace
50-Greg Biffle
99-Kurt Busch
1-Dennis Setzer
3-Bryan Reffner
16-Jimmy Hensley
25-Randy Tolsma

Failed to qualify: Steve Prescott (#03), Coy Gibbs (#20), Phil Bonifield (#23), Morgan Shepherd (#7), Ronnie Hornaday (#92), Donny Morelock (#4), Ryan McGlynn (#00), Wes Russell (#47), Wayne Edwards (#93), Tony Ave (#31), Jason Thom (#37), Loni Richardson (#0)

Federated Auto Parts 250 

The Federated Auto Parts 250 was held August 12 at Nashville Speedway USA. Jamie McMurray won the pole.

Top ten results

25-Randy Tolsma
1-Dennis Setzer
84-Chad Chaffin
18-Joe Ruttman
43-Steve Grissom
60-Andy Houston
86-Scott Riggs
3-Bryan Reffner
17-Ricky Hendrick
14-Rick Crawford

Failed to qualify: Brian Rose (#31), Ryan McGlynn (#00), Bobby Gill (#15), Ricky Sanders (#19), Wayne Edwards (#93), Jeff Beck (#27), Conrad Burr (#28), R. D. Smith (#79), Phil Bonifield (#23), Loni Richardson (#0), Tim Martin (#04)

This was Randy Tolsma's last Truck Series victory.

Sears Craftsman 175 of Chicago 

The inaugural Sears Craftsman 175 of Chicago was held August 27 at Chicago Motor Speedway. Joe Ruttman won the pole.

Top ten results

18-Joe Ruttman
50-Greg Biffle
2-Mike Wallace
60-Andy Houston
66-Rick Carelli
41-Jamie McMurray
3-Bryan Reffner
88-Terry Cook
73-B.A. Wilson
25-Randy Tolsma

Failed to qualify: Wayne Edwards (#93), Stan Boyd (#89), Brad Payne (#33), Donnie Neuenberger (#21), Jay Stewart (#30), Phil Bonifield (#23), Brendan Gaughan (#62)

Kroger 200 

The Kroger 200 was held September 7 at Richmond International Raceway. Kurt Busch won the pole.

Top ten results

66-Rick Carelli
50-Greg Biffle
99-Kurt Busch
18-Joe Ruttman
86-Scott Riggs
24-Jack Sprague
52-Ken Schrader
1-Dennis Setzer
43-Steve Grissom
4-Bobby Hamilton

Failed to qualify: Coy Gibbs (#20), Ricky Hendrick (#17), Morgan Shepherd (#80), Darren Shaw (#11), J. D. Gibbs (#48), Steve Prescott (#03), Brian Sockwell (#54), Brian Rose (#98), Wayne Edwards (#93), Bill Lester (#23), Jim Mills (#30), Loni Richardson (#0), Scotty Sands (#47)

MBNA e-commerce 200 

The inaugural MBNA e-commerce 200 was held September 22 at Dover International Speedway. Kurt Busch won the pole.

Top ten results

99-Kurt Busch
50-Greg Biffle
14-Rick Crawford
60-Andy Houston
52-Ken Schrader
41-Jamie McMurray
75-Marty Houston
66-Rick Carelli
1-Dennis Setzer
43-Carlos Contreras

Failed to qualify: Ron Barfield Jr. (#97), Kenny Martin (#98), Morgan Shepherd (#80), Larry Gunselman (#31), Tony Roper (#26), Ricky Sanders (#19), Ryan McGlynn (#00), Jerry Miller (#32), Michael Hamby (#0), Donnie Neuenbeger (#84), Jim Mills (#30)

O'Reilly 400 

The O'Reilly 400 was held October 13 at Texas Motor Speedway. Bryan Reffner won the pole.

Top ten results

3-Bryan Reffner
60-Andy Houston
99-Kurt Busch
16-Jimmy Hensley
1-Dennis Setzer
14-Rick Crawford
25-Randy Tolsma
17-Ricky Hendrick
66-Rick Carelli
44-Mark Petty

Failed to qualify: Morgan Shepherd (#80), Bobby Dotter (#45), Wayne Edwards (#93), Ron Barfield Jr. (#97), Carl Long (#32), Jay Stewart (#33), Richie Hearn (#23), Gene Christensen (#92)
On lap 31 of 167, Tony Roper was racing for position when he collided with another truck and struck the front straightaway wall head-on. He died the next day from the injuries suffered in that wreck.
On a happier note, Greg Biffle even by finishing 25th due to an accident, clinched the championship with 1 race remaining. It was Jack Roush's first NASCAR championship of any kind.
This was Bryan Reffner's only Truck Series victory.

Motorola 200 

The Motorola 200 was held October 28 at California Speedway. Kurt Busch won the pole.

Top ten results

99-Kurt Busch
60-Andy Houston
18-Joe Ruttman
24-Jack Sprague
50-Greg Biffle
3-Bryan Reffner
29-Terry Cook
75-Marty Houston
88-Matt Crafton
16-Jimmy Hensley

Failed to qualify: Tom Powers (#5), Rick Ware (#51), Michael Hamby (#0)

First career start for eventual three-time series champion Matt Crafton.

Final points standings 

Greg Biffle – 3826
Kurt Busch – 3596
Andy Houston – 3566
Mike Wallace – 3450
Jack Sprague – 3316
Joe Ruttman – 3278
Dennis Setzer – 3214
Randy Tolsma – 3157
Bryan Reffner – 3153
Steve Grissom – 3113
Rick Crawford – 3053
Marty Houston – 2942
Jimmy Hensley – 2933
Terry Cook – 2805
Rick Carelli – 2606
Lance Norick – 2430
Carlos Contreras – 2414
Rob Morgan – 2353
Randy MacDonald – 2321
Scott Riggs – 2078
B. A. Wilson – 2047
Jamie McMurray – 1679
Randy Renfrow – 1610
Rick Ware – 1585
Ryan McGlynn – 1581
Wayne Edwards – 1391
Coy Gibbs – 1226
Lance Hooper – 1199
David Starr – 1163
Ricky Hendrick – 846
Andy Genzman – 780
Jim Inglebright – 742
John Young – 720
Mark Petty – 719
Ken Schrader – 688
Ricky Sanders – 667
Kenny Martin – 652
Tom Carey – 652
Phil Bonifield – 617
Brendan Gaughan – 615
Mike Cope – 594
Bobby Hamilton – 586
Michael Dokken – 532
Ron Barfield Jr. – 501
Brad Bennett – 473
Jeff Beck – 467
Morgan Shepherd – 465
Donny Morelock – 459
J. D. Gibbs –  444
Brian Sockwell – 435

Rookie of the Year 
Kurt Busch, winner of Roush Racing's first Gong Show, took home Rookie of the Year honors in 2000, winning four races and finishing second in points. The top runner-up was Carlos Contreras, the first Mexican to compete full-time in the Truck Series. Scott Riggs started the year with several underfunded teams, before becoming Contreras' teammate at Impact Motorsports. Rick Ware, Wayne Edwards, Kenny Martin, and Coy Gibbs all declared for ROTY but struggled in qualifying, while Mark Petty made a delayed attempt at the award. Businessman Donny Morelock and Coy's brother J. D. rounded out the rookie class of 2000.

See also
2000 NASCAR Winston Cup Series
2000 NASCAR Busch Series

References

External links 
Craftsman Truck Series Standings and Statistics - Racing-Reference.info
Archived NASCAR.com results

NASCAR Truck Series seasons